Ira P. DeLoache (1879-1965) was an American real estate developer. He was the founder of Whiteface, Texas. He was the main developer Preston Hollow, an upper-middle-class neighborhood in Dallas, Texas.

Early life
Ira Pleasant DeLoache was born on September 21, 1879 on a plantation in North Carolina.

Career
DeLoache moved to Dallas in 1909 and sold cigarettes there until 1915.

In 1922, DeLoache flew in an airplane over Dallas and decided to become a developer. He turned his father-in-law's ranch near Lubbock, Texas into the new town of Whiteface, Texas in 1924.

Two years later, in 1926, he opened a real estate development firm in Dallas. He began developing buildings in Downtown Dallas. Shortly after, he developed buildings along Knox Street in Highland Park, Texas.

De Loache became the main developer of Preston Hollow, an upper-middle-class neighborhood in Dallas. He purchased one hundred acres to start developing the area later to become known as Preston Hollow in 1930. He retired in 1960.

Personal life
DeLoache married Nelle Slaughter (May 24, 1892 – January 1, 1964), the daughter of C.C. Slaughter (February 9, 1837 – January 25, 1919), in 1913. They had three children, Ira Averill DeLoache (1917-1938), Nelle Jourdan DeLoache (1919-1975)  and James Ira DeLoache (1923-2007). They resided on Preston Road in Preston Hollow, Dallas, Texas.

Death
He died on October 31, 1965 in a retirement facility in Dallas, Texas. He was eighty-six years old.

References

External links

1879 births
1965 deaths
People from North Carolina
People from Dallas
Businesspeople from Texas
American city founders
American real estate businesspeople